Thomas FitzGerald, Earl of Offaly (12 January 1974 – 9 May 1997), styled The Hon. Thomas FitzGerald before 1976 and as Earl of Offaly between 1976 and 1997, was the only son of Maurice, Marquess of Kildare (now the 9th Duke of Leinster).

In May 1997, Lord Offaly was killed in a car accident in Ireland. A fund for dyslexics (the T.O.M. Fund) was established in his memory.

The Earl of Offaly is buried in the churchyard of All Saints' Church, Sutton Courtenay, Oxfordshire (formerly part of Berkshire).

References

1974 births
1997 deaths
Courtesy earls
Road incident deaths in the Republic of Ireland
Thomas